The candidate information for the Onehouse Ward in Mid-Suffolk, Suffolk, England.

Councillors

2011 Results

2015 Results
The turnout of the election was 70.75%.

See also
Mid Suffolk local elections

References

External links
Mid Suffolk Council

Wards of Mid Suffolk District